Viljo Suokas (13 May 1925, Metsäpirtti – 7 June 2012) was a Finnish farmer and politician. He was a Member of the Parliament of Finland, representing the Finnish Rural Party (SMP) from 1970 to 1972 and the Finnish People's Unity Party (SKYP) from 1972 to 1975.

References

1925 births
2012 deaths
People from Priozersky District
Finnish Rural Party politicians
Finnish People's Unity Party politicians
Members of the Parliament of Finland (1970–72)
Members of the Parliament of Finland (1972–75)